Queen of the Mississippi is an overnight riverboat being built by American Cruise Lines (ACL) at Chesapeake Shipbuilding in Salisbury, Maryland for overnight river cruising on the Mississippi , Ohio, Tennessee , and Cumberland rivers in the United States.  This riverboat was announced to assume the Queen of the Mississippi  name after the previous ship was repositioned to the  Columbia River and renamed in early 2016.  However, the American Eagle quietly assumed the name in 2016 without clarification of whether this vessel will become Queen of the Mississippi in 2017 or sail under a different name.

References

External links
 Official website

2017 ships
Cruise ships of the United States
Ships built in Salisbury, Maryland